The 1940 Constitution of the Latvian Soviet Socialist  Republic was adopted by the 2nd session of the People's Saeima of Latvia on .

The constitution was based on the 1936 Constitution of the Soviet Union. The basic provisions of both constitutions were basically same, except the second chapter of the constitution, on which Latvia retains its pre-Soviet territorial division.

History 
The commission formulates the constitution by translating the 1936 Constitution of the Soviet Union and made several changes to the translated version that account the specific situation of Latvia. The final constitution symbolizes "the tremendous upsurge of the masses who overthrew the exploiting classes".

The constitution was first published on the News of the Presidium of the Supreme Council of the Latvian SSR (Latvijas PSR Augstākās Padomes Prezidija Ziņotājs) on 3 October 1940. The constitution was amended in the sessions of the Supreme Soviet of the Latvian SSR. The constitution lasted for 38 years, which was replaced by the new Brezhnevist Constitution on April 18, 1978, at the extraordinary eighth session of the Supreme Soviet of the Latvian SSR.

Structure 
The Constitution is divided into 11 chapters and 118 articles.
 The Organization of Society
 The Organization of the State
 The Highest Organs of State Authority of the Latvian SSR
 The Organs of Government of the Latvian SSR
 The Organs of the Local Governments 
 The Budget of the Latvian SSR
 The Courts and the Procurator's Office
 Fundamental Rights and Duties of Citizens
 The Electoral System
 Arms, Flag, Capital
 Procedure for Amending the Constitution

References

Citations

Bibliography 
 
 
 
 
 
 

Latvian constitutional law
Latvia
Latvian Soviet Socialist Republic
1940 in Latvia
1940 in law
1940 documents